Aredio Gimona (1 February 1924 – 11 February 1994) was an Italian professional football player and coach who played as a midfielder. He represented Italy at the 1952 Summer Olympics.

References

External links
 

1924 births
1994 deaths
Italian footballers
Italy international footballers
Serie A players
Serie C players
A.C. Milan players
U.S. Livorno 1915 players
Palermo F.C. players
Juventus F.C. players
Aurora Pro Patria 1919 players
Empoli F.C. players
Olympic footballers of Italy
Footballers at the 1952 Summer Olympics
Italian football managers
U.S. Pistoiese 1921 managers
S.S. Arezzo managers
U.S. Livorno 1915 managers
Genoa C.F.C. managers
People from Izola
Association football midfielders
A.S. Pro Gorizia players